Austin Friary was an Augustinian friary in Bristol, England. It was established in 1313, when Simon de Montecute gave  of land within the Temple Gate of Bristol.  Further gifts of land were made by William de Montecute and Thomas of Berkeley during the next thirty years.

The monks constructed a pipe to supply themselves with water from a reservoir on the west bank of the Avon.  This reservoir was fed from a spring, Ravenswell, in the cliff rising to Totterdown from the Avon.  The pipe remained in use for water supply to the Temple district until the nineteenth century.

The prior and six remaining friars surrendered the friary and the remaining furniture and vestments to commissioner Richard Yngworth in 1538, during the Dissolution of the Monasteries.

No traces of the buildings survive today.  The area has been extensively redeveloped since the eighteenth century and is now occupied by the headquarters of Bristol & West, a commercial bank which is a subsidiary of the Bank of Ireland.

References

Works cited

Friaries in Bristol
1313 establishments in England
1538 disestablishments in England
Christian monasteries established in the 14th century
Former buildings and structures in Bristol